Clavus powelli is a species of sea snail, a marine gastropod mollusk in the family Drilliidae.

Description
The shell grows to a length of 6 mm.

Distribution
This species occurs in the demersal zone of the Eastern Central Pacific off Hawaii and Fiji.

References

 Kay, E. Alison. Hawaiian marine shells. Vol. 64. Bishop Museum Press, 1979.
 Tucker, J.K. 2004 Catalog of recent and fossil turrids (Mollusca: Gastropoda). Zootaxa 682:1–1295

External links
 

powelli
Gastropods described in 1979